Megachile coquimbensis is a species of bee in the family Megachilidae. It was first described by Ruiz in 1938. The Global Biodiversity Information Facility lists its geographic division as South America; all GBIF-recognized occurrences, as of January, 2022, are attributed to Chile.

References

Coquimbensis
Insects described in 1938